Teacher's Pet is a 1958 American romantic comedy film directed by George Seaton, and starring Clark Gable, Doris Day, Gig Young, and Mamie Van Doren.

Plot
Journalism instructor Erica Stone asks journalist James Gannon to speak to her night school class. He turns down the invitation via a nasty letter to her. His managing editor, however, orders him to accept the assignment. He arrives late to find Stone reading aloud his letter and mocking him in front of her class.

Humiliated, he decides to join the class as a student in order to show up Stone and poses as a wallpaper salesman. The instructor is somewhat intrigued by this charming older man, whom she finds an exceptional student. Gannon continues his ruse and becomes attracted to Stone. He finds he has to contend with Dr. Pine, as well as his own girlfriend, Peggy DeFore, a nightclub singer. When Stone discovers Gannon's deception, she immediately calls off their relationship. Dr. Pine convinces her to give Gannon another chance.

In the end, Jim and Erica have come to understand, and partially adopt, the other's point of view.

Cast
Clark Gable as James Gannon – city editor for a large metropolitan newspaper, with no education past the 8th grade, who is convinced that formal education is "a waste of time" for anyone who would like to get into the newspaper business and that experience in the workplace is the key to success
Doris Day as Erica Stone – journalism instructor at a local university with whom Gannon falls in love
Gig Young as Dr. Hugo Pine – a worldly and attractive psychologist who has "more degrees than a thermometer", and Gannon's (perceived) rival for Stone's affections
Mamie Van Doren as Peggy DeFore – nightclub singer and Gannon's girlfriend
Nick Adams as Barney Kovac – copy boy at Gannon's paper who idolizes him.
Peter Baldwin as Harold Miller, cub reporter
Marion Ross as Katy Fuller, Stone's secretary
Charles Lane as Roy, assistant city editor
Army Archerd as Himself

Release
The film opened in the United States on March 19, 1958 and finished fifth at the US box office in its opening week.

Awards and nominations

See also
 List of American films of 1958

References

External links

1958 films
American romantic comedy films
American black-and-white films
Paramount Pictures films
Films scored by Roy Webb
Films directed by George Seaton
Films about journalists
Films about educators
Films set in universities and colleges
Films produced by William Perlberg
Films produced by George Seaton
1950s English-language films
1950s American films